John III, Count of Nassau-Beilstein (1490 – 11 December 1561) was a son of John II and his wife Maria of Solms-Braunfels.

In 1513, he succeeded his father as Count of Nassau-Beilstein.  In 1523, he married Anna (1505–1564), a daughter of Louis I (1473–1523) of Nassau-Weilburg and Margaret of Nassau-Wiesbaden (1487–1548).

He died on 11 December 1561. As he had no male heir, Nassau-Beilstein fell back to Nassau-Dillenburg.

References 

House of Nassau
Counts of Nassau
1490 births
1561 deaths
16th-century German people